The Governors Village is a 450+ acre New Urbanism neighborhood and census-designated place (CDP) in Chatham County, North Carolina, United States, with an address of Chapel Hill. It was first listed as a CDP in the 2020 census with a population of 1,512.

Governors Village consists of four  residential home neighborhoods (Governors Village, Governors Park, Governors Forest, Governors Lake), 160 townhomes (Governors Village and Governors Lake Townes), 242 apartments (Camden Governors Village), and multiple commercial buildings. Domicile Realty is located in Governors Village and handles on site sales within the community.

Governors Village is located directly across the street from the main entrance to Governors Club, a 1,600 acre gated community with a 27-hole Jack Nicklaus Signature Golf Course with over 1,200 homes.

Business district

The original Governors Village Shopping Center opened in 2000 with the opening of Food Lion.  That shopping center now includes a dry cleaners, nail salon, Papa John's Pizza and a Subway.  Shortly thereafter, RBC Bank (now PNC Bank) opened at the main entrance to Governors Village.   
In 2005, a second shopping center opened in Governors Village featuring several restaurants, a veterinarian, and dentist's office.  In 2012, The Commons @ Governors Village, another commercial retail center, opened housing the office of Domicile Realty, Bold Construction , Governors Pharmacy (an independent pharmacy), with AllState Insurance opening an office in 2016.  In 2017 a new commercial building opened with more commercial space opening in the future.

Recreation

The community has numerous parks, sidewalks and walking trails including a small community lake.  In addition, the community is located just a few miles from Jordan Lake, a large recreation lake.

Awards

Based on its community and volunteer activities Governors Village was named "Community of the Year" for 2009 by the North Carolina Chapter of the Community Associations Institute (Mid-sized Mixed-Use division).

Demographics

2020 census

Note: the US Census treats Hispanic/Latino as an ethnic category. This table excludes Latinos from the racial categories and assigns them to a separate category. Hispanics/Latinos can be of any race.

References

External links
 Official web site

Chapel Hill-Carrboro, North Carolina
Geography of Orange County, North Carolina
Census-designated places in North Carolina
Census-designated places in Chatham County, North Carolina
New Urbanism communities